Luis Alberto Redher Espinosa (born 27 August 1964 in Lima) is a retired Peruvian footballer who played for Real Zaragoza in Spain during the 1989–90 season. He also played for Sporting Cristal and Alianza Lima.

External links
Player profile at PlayerHistory.com 
La Liga profile 
Profile

1964 births
Living people
Footballers from Lima
Association football midfielders
Peruvian footballers
Sporting Cristal footballers
Real Zaragoza players
La Liga players
Club Alianza Lima footballers
Peruvian expatriate footballers
Expatriate footballers in Spain
Sport Áncash managers